Ogura is a Japanese surname.

Ogura may also refer to:

Places
 Lake Ogura, a lake  located near Kyoto in the Kyoto prefecture
 Ogura Station, a railway station in Uji, Kyoto, Japan
 Mount Ogura, a mountain in Nagano Prefecture, Japan

Other uses
 Ogura (小倉), a red bean paste
 Ogura (Densetsu no Stafy) (オーグラ), an antagonist in the video game Densetsu no Stafy